Double MS recording is an audio recording technique used to record surround sounds using three microphones. The mid mic usually a cardioid mic, the sides using a figure of 8 mic, and the rear using another cardioid mic. This is usually used for recording ambiance sounds and not live music.

From these three tracks, five channels can be extracted:
 Center= Mid/Mid Mic
 Left=Mid+Side
 Right=Mid+Invert(Side)
 Surround Left=Rear+Side
 Surround Right=Rear+Invert(Side)

References

Sound recording